Kungstornen (King's Towers) are twin tower skyscrapers, individually named Norra Kungstornet (Northern King's Tower) and Södra Kungstornet (Southern King's Tower), in Norrmalm, Stockholm. Together, they are considered the first modern skyscrapers in Europe.

The tower pair marks a slight bend in the street, one block east of Hötorget, where it is crossed by the  Malmskillnadsbron, a bridge in the course of Malmskillnadsgatan, to which they are adjacent. Their construction was inspired by American models, particularly the architecture of Lower Manhattan of the time. The north tower was designed by Sven Wallander who also authored the 1919 master plan for Kungsgatan; the southern tower was designed by Ivar Callmander.

References

External links

 

Buildings and structures in Stockholm
Twin towers
Neoclassical architecture in Sweden
Skyscraper office buildings in Sweden